This article lists political parties in Saint Lucia.
Saint Lucia has a two-party system, which means that there are two dominant political parties, with extreme difficulty for anybody to achieve electoral success under the banner of any other party.

The parties

Major parties

Minor parties
 National Green Party

Defunct parties
 Lucian Greens Party
 Lucian People's Movement (LPM)
 National Alliance
 National Development Movement (NDM)
 People's Progressive Party
 Saint Lucia Freedom Party
 Sou Tout Apwe Fete Fini (STAFF)

See also
 Politics of Saint Lucia
 List of political parties by country

References

Saint Lucia
 
Political parties
Saint Lucia
Political parties